Kiantajärvi is a rather large lake in Finland, in the Oulujoki main catchment area. It is located in Suomussalmi municipality, in the region of Kainuu. It is the 24th biggest lake in Finland. The lake is narrow and 50 km long in north–south direction.

History 
Kiantajärvi lake  played a significant role in the Battle of Suomussalmi during the Winter War in December 1939.

Kiantajärvi is also known for the author Ilmari Kianto, who had his home named Turjanlinna on the shore of Niskaselkä open area. The author's grave is situated in Niettussaari island near his home.

References

Oulujoki basin
Landforms of Kainuu
Lakes of Suomussalmi